Navalkishore Dogra (born 5 October 1973) was an Indian cricketer. He was a right-handed batsman and right-arm off-break bowler who played for Himachal Pradesh. He was born in Hamirpur.

Dogra made his List A debut for the team during the 1996–97 season, against Haryana, against whom he scored two runs. He made one further List A appearance for the side, two weeks later, in which he scored 45 runs, the highest total of any individual in the team.

External links
Navalkishore Dogra at Cricket Archive 

1973 births
Living people
Indian cricketers
Himachal Pradesh cricketers